Boris Vallaud (born 25 July 1975) is a French politician of the Socialist Party who was elected to the French National Assembly in the 2017 elections, representing the department of Landes.

Early life and education
Vallaud studied at Lycée Louis-Barthou in Pau, Pyrénées-Atlantiques and then graduated from École nationale d'administration (ENA) in 2004, alongside Emmanuel Macron.

Political career
From 2013 until 2014, Vallaud served as chief of staff to Ministry of the Economy and Finance Arnaud Montebourg. He subsequently worked on the staff of President François Hollande from 2014 until 2016.

In parliament, Vallaud serves as member of the Committee on Social Affairs. In addition to his committee assignments, he is a member of the French-Lebanese Parliamentary Friendship Group.

Political positions
Vallaud was one of only five Socialist MPs who did not vote in favor of confirming Prime Minister Édouard Philippe's government in 2017. He has since been considered one of the sharpest critics of the Philippe government.

In response to a 2019 law authorizing the sale of the government's controlling stake in Groupe ADP, Vallaud led a cross-party initiative which called for a referendum to overturn the legislation, citing concerns over the loss of government revenue and influence.

See also
 2017 French legislative election

References

1975 births
Living people
Sciences Po alumni
École nationale d'administration alumni
People from Pau, Pyrénées-Atlantiques
Deputies of the 15th National Assembly of the French Fifth Republic
Socialist Party (France) politicians
Deputies of the 16th National Assembly of the French Fifth Republic